Swift Rapids Marine Railway was one of two patent slips used on the Trent-Severn Waterway using the same plan design. Built in 1919 as temporary solution by Orillia Water Light and Power Commission next to their hydro dam (the slip foundation was a lock) and was later staffed by two operators from Transport Canada and replaced in 1964 by the Giant Lock to take vessels up and down the  difference. It is located in Swift Rapids, a community within the township of Severn, Ontario.

Unlike Big Chute, Swift Rapids was only accessed via water (Swift Rapids Road from Severn, Ontario is used by railway staff and currently serves service vehicles from Parks Canada and Orillia Power) and did not become a tourist attraction. Houses built to house power station staff are mostly unused (2 in use by lock master and power station operator), school closed in 1960 and general store/post office in 1985.

See also

 Big Chute Marine Railway

References

Boat lifts
Canals in Ontario